The Alagteeg Formation is a geological formation in Mongolia whose strata date back to the Late Cretaceous. Dinosaur remains are among the fossils that have been recovered from the formation. It predominantly consists of alternating reddish brown mudstone and horizontally laminated sandstone, with ripple cross laminations and rhizoliths. It was first formally defined as a unit by Hasegawa et al in 2008 as a distinct unit from the overlying Djadochta Formation. The environment of deposition is suggested to be fluvial, originating in sandy braided river, floodplain and ephemeral lake depositional environments, as opposed to the desert depositional environment of the Djadochta Formation.

Vertebrate paleofauna 
 Abdarainurus
 Pinacosaurus
 Plesiohadros
 Protoceratops
 Trionychidae indet.

See also 
 List of dinosaur-bearing rock formations

References

Bibliography 
  
  
  

Geologic formations of Mongolia
Upper Cretaceous Series of Asia
Cretaceous Mongolia
Campanian Stage
Santonian Stage
Sandstone formations
Fluvial deposits
Paleontology in Mongolia
Formations